The 1863 Ohio gubernatorial election was held on October 13, 1863. National Union nominee John Brough defeated Democratic nominee Clement Vallandigham with 60.61% of the vote.

General election

Candidates
John Brough, National Union
Clement Vallandigham, Democratic

Results

References

1863
Ohio